Punisher: War Zone is a 2008 action thriller film based on the Marvel Comics character the Punisher, directed by Lexi Alexander. The film is a reboot that follows the war waged by vigilante Frank Castle (Ray Stevenson) on crime and corruption, in particular on the disfigured mob boss known as Billy "Jigsaw" Russotti (Dominic West), rather than a sequel to 2004's The Punisher. It is the third feature film adaptation of The Punisher, the second reboot thereof and the first of two films to be produced under the Marvel Knights production banner, which focuses on films for mature audiences. Punisher: War Zone was released in North America by Lionsgate on December 5, 2008, and it was released in the United Kingdom by Sony Pictures Releasing on February 6, 2009 to negative reviews and grossed $10 million worldwide, making it a commercial failure. Its related soundtrack hit the #23 slot on Billboard's Top Independent Albums chart.

It was the final Punisher film to be produced by an outside studio before the rights reverted to Marvel Studios, with Stevenson reprising his role as Castle in The Super Hero Squad Show. A television series was later released on Netflix in 2017 and is set in the Marvel Cinematic Universe.

Plot 

Having lost his family to mob violence, former Force Recon Marine Frank Castle has spent the last five years as a vigilante known as the Punisher. Castle assaults a party for local Don Gaitano Cesare, and kills him and the guests. Cesare's caporegime Billy "The Beaut" Russotti escapes to his recycling plant hideout, and Detectives Martin Soap and Saffiotti, who were staking out the party, inform Castle. Castle infiltrates Russoti's hideout, and after a brief firefight, Russoti is thrown into a glass-crushing machine that leaves him hideously disfigured. Russoti later refers to himself as "Jigsaw" because the stitches in his face resemble puzzle pieces. Castle, who takes cover behind the body of Nicky Donatelli, discovers that Donatelli was actually an undercover FBI agent.

Agent Paul Budiansky, the deceased agent's partner, joins the NYPD's "Punisher Task Force", partnering with Soap to help bring Castle to justice. Meanwhile, Jigsaw frees his deranged and cannibalistic brother, "Loony Bin Jim".

Distraught over killing the agent, Castle unsuccessfully attempts to make reparations to Donatelli's wife, Angela, and daughter, Grace. Castle threatens to retire from the vigilante business, but his armorer Microchip makes him reconsider, telling him that Jigsaw will go after Donatelli's family for revenge.

Jigsaw, Loony Bin Jim and their two henchmen, Ink and Pittsy, break into Donatelli's house and hold the family hostage. The Punisher tracks down Maginty, a known associate of Jigsaw, executing him after extracting the information before Budiansky and Soap apprehend him. Castle tells him that Jigsaw went after Donatelli's family, and Budiansky sends a police car to check on the Donatelli residence, intending to turn the Punisher in. When the patrol car fails to respond, Budiansky checks on the house, where Ink and Pittsy capture him. Soap frees the Punisher, who kills both Ink and Pittsy before leading Angela and Grace away. Budiansky then arrests Jigsaw and Loony Bin Jim after a short gunfight.

Jigsaw and his brother bargain with the FBI for their release by giving up Cristu Bulat, who was smuggling in a biological weapon destined for Arab terrorists in Queens, New York. The brothers are granted immunity, plus the US$12 million Bulat was paying to use Jigsaw's port, and a file on Micro. They take Micro hostage, killing his mother in the process. They once again take the Donatellis hostage, after critically injuring Micro's associate Carlos, whom Castle had left to protect them. Castle later arrives at the hideout, and euthanizes Carlos. Jigsaw sets himself up in the Bradstreet Hotel, putting together a small army of gangsters desiring vengeance against the Punisher. Castle enlists the help of Budiansky, who informs Cristu's father, Tiberiu Bulat, about Jigsaw's location. Tiberiu's enforcers start a shootout in the hotel lobby, affording Castle a distraction.

Castle enters through a second-floor window, leading to a firefight with Jigsaw's hired guns. Afterward, Castle engages Loony Bin Jim in solo combat; realizing that he will probably not survive the brawl, Jim flees. Castle chases and confronts both him and Jigsaw, who are holding Micro and Grace at gunpoint. Jigsaw gives Castle a choice: If Frank shoots Micro, Jigsaw will let the others go free. Micro bravely offers his life to save the girl, but Castle chooses to shoot Loony Bin Jim instead. As a result, Jigsaw kills Micro. Enraged that his partner died, Castle attacks Jigsaw, eventually impaling him with a metal rod and throwing him onto a fire. As Jigsaw burns to death, Castle calmly tells him, "This is just the beginning." Outside, Angela forgives Castle, who bids farewell to Budiansky and the Donatelli family. As Castle and Soap leave together, Soap tries to convince Castle to give up his vigilante status after having "killed every criminal in town." Soap changes his mind when he is held up by a murderous mugger, who quickly becomes another victim of the Punisher.

Cast
 Ray Stevenson as Frank Castle / The Punisher: Prior to filming, Stevenson read every possible issue of the Punisher MAX series, underwent endurance, martial arts, and weapons training with former Force Recon Marines and film fight choreographer Pat Johnson.
 Wayne Knight as Linus Lieberman / Microchip: Armorer to the Punisher.
 Colin Salmon as FBI Agent Paul Budiansky: Former partner of Nicky Donatelli. Based on an NYPD officer of the same name in the Punisher story arc "Widowmaker".
 Doug Hutchison as James Russoti / "Loony Bin Jim" / "LBJ": A chemically imbalanced, cannibalistic, psychopath whose veins practically flow with adrenaline and testosterone, leaving him in a constant state of homicidal mania that he alleviates by going on periodical killing sprees.
 Dominic West as Billy "The Beaut" Russoti / "Jigsaw": A vain and image-obsessed Mafia killer. By killing off the established gangsters, Punisher creates the opportunity for Jigsaw to become a boss. Paddy Considine was considered for the role of Jigsaw in the film, but the offer was retracted and given to West who had previously turned it down.
 Dash Mihok as Detective Martin Soap: Head detective of the "Punisher Task Force".
 Romano Orzari as FBI Agent Nicky Donatelli: An undercover FBI agent attached to Russoti whose death is the catalyst for the events in the story.
 Julie Benz as Angela Donatelli: Nicky's wife
 Stephanie Janusauskas as Grace Donatelli: Nicky's daughter
 Larry Day as FBI Senior Agent Miller
 Ron Lea as Captain Ross
 T. J. Storm as Maginty: Leader of an Urban Freeflow gang. Maginty comes from the Punisher story arc "Kitchen Irish" and is an Irish gangster.
 Bjanka Murgel as Amy Candy: The girlfriend of Jigsaw.
 Mark Camacho as Carmine "Pittsy" Gazzera: One of Jigsaw's henchmen, and Ink's father. One of two henchmen originating from the Punisher story arc "In the Beginning".
 Keram Malicki-Sánchez as "Ink" Gazzera: One of Jigsaw's henchmen, and Pittsy's son. One of two henchmen originating from the Punisher story arc "In the Beginning".
 Carlos Gonzalez-Vio as Carlos Cruz: Former Latin Kings gangbanger who allied with Micro and effectively Punisher.
 David Vadim as Cristu Bulat: One of multiple villains originating from the Punisher story arc "The Slavers".
 Aubert Pallascio as Tiberiu Bulat: Cristu's father. One of multiple villains originating from the Punisher story arc "The Slavers".

Production

Development
In February 2004, two months prior to The Punishers theatrical debut, Lions Gate Entertainment announced the studio's intent to produce a sequel. Avi Arad, chairman and CEO of Marvel Studios, expressed his interest in developing the franchise, saying that the second film would "become the fifth Marvel property to become a sequel." In March, the director of the first film, Jonathan Hensleigh, said that he was interested in working with Thomas Jane again for The Punisher 2. In April, Jane said that the villain for The Punisher 2 would be Jigsaw. In November, Jane said that the studio was interested in making a sequel based on successful DVD sales of The Punisher and was developing the preliminary budget for the follow-up.

In March 2005, Marvel Studios announced a 2006 theatrical release date for The Punisher 2. In April, Lions Gate Entertainment's CEO, Jon Feltheimer, confirmed at LGF's 2005 fiscal third quarter analyst call that the studio had completed its deal to develop The Punisher 2. Prior to July, Arad revealed that the script was being rewritten and that the sequel would start filming within the year. By July, Jane had put on an additional 12 pounds of muscle, and was hoping for filming to start in late 2006.

In March 2006, The Punisher 2 was announced to be produced in Louisiana, being listed in the domestic charter under Louisiana's Secretary of State. In August, Marvel Entertainment revealed a new film slate that included The Punisher 2 on its partial list with production still to be determined. Thomas Jane said that the writer was halfway through a draft and that he believed filming would begin by February 2007. Jane confirmed that the villain Jigsaw, first announced in April 2004, would be in the film. Jane also said that director Jonathan Hensleigh would not be returning to direct the sequel. In addition, Lions Gate Entertainment, amidst the studios returning to New Orleans following Hurricane Katrina, announced that The Punisher 2 would begin filming within the year. In October, Jane said the script was due in a couple of weeks, and that it would be "darker, bloodier and more unfriendly than the first one." In December, the screenplay was being rewritten by screenwriter Stuart Beattie.

It was announced that Kurt Sutter, a writer for The Shield, was involved with the script for The Punisher 2. Sutter said that he had an enjoyable time writing the script for the sequel and that it was going to be very true to the character. In a separate interview, Thomas Jane revealed that a new script had been turned in and everyone was hoping it would work out, as the lack of a good script had been holding up production. He further stated that if everything goes as planned then filming should begin in June or July, but shortly afterward, in a letter to Ain't It Cool News, Jane wrote that he had pulled out of the movie, stating:

Directing
In May 2007, director John Dahl was in talks to direct, but declined, citing a bad script and lack of budget as reasons for passing. In June, it was announced that Lexi Alexander would then take over the role as director as a result. In a December 2008 interview, Alexander revealed that when she first got the Punisher 2 script she passed on the project, but later changed her mind after reading the MAX adult Punisher comics, and getting assurances from Lionsgate that she could give the project a new look and feel – and cast a new actor in the central role of the Punisher. Director Alexander pitched her vision of the film as a throwback to '80s era action films, stating, "I said can we do it like this, and they all said that's exactly what we want to do."

Casting
On July 21, it was announced that actor Ray Stevenson would play the Punisher in the sequel to the 2004 film. Filming was slated to begin in October 2007 in Montreal. Prior to filming, Stevenson read every available issue of The Punisher MAX, underwent endurance, martial arts, and weapons training with former Force Recon Marines and film fight choreographer Pat Johnson. In August, a working title for the film, The Punisher: Welcome Back Frank, was announced. On August 28, Lionsgate announced that the new working name for The Punisher 2 would be Punisher: War Zone. In mid-September, the director announced cast members joining Stevenson with Dash Mihok as Detective Martin Soap, Colin Salmon as Agent Paul Budiansky, and Doug Hutchison as Loony Bin Jim. It was announced on September 25 via The Hollywood Reporter that Dominic West will star as the main antagonist, Jigsaw, and Wayne Knight will play the Punisher's armorer, Microchip. Paddy Considine was considered for the role of Jigsaw in the film, but the offer was retracted and given to West who had previously turned it down. Freddie Prinze Jr. also auditioned for the role, but was refused by Lionsgate Studios from accepting the part. Filming occurred from October 22 until December 14 in Montreal. Principal photography for Punisher: War Zone was completed on December 27.

On February 14, 2008, Sutter officially removed his name from credit arbitration, stating:

Music 

While the film itself was a 'box office bomb', the soundtrack achieved considerable commercial success, reaching #23 on Billboard's 'Top Independent Albums' chart.

An original score to the film was composed by Michael Wandmacher, whose primary focus in making the score was to "create a definitive musical identity for the Punisher. I knew I needed something dark, relentless and muscular, but I also couldn't forget Frank's humanity, his personal torment and deep sadness. So, I approached the job equally as a fan and as a composer." In order to make the character of Frank Castle seem less one dimensional, Wandmacher decided to include snare cadences and powerful, dynamic ostinatos and slowly rising string repetitions to mimic a relentless entity, like an approaching battalion.

Creative conflicts
The film was set for a September 12, 2008, release, but was pushed back three months to December 5, 2008. A teaser trailer was released on June 12, 2008. On July 25, Harry Knowles of Ain't It Cool News wrote an article claiming that Lexi Alexander had been removed as the film's director. A second trailer was revealed to the public at the San Diego ComicCon on the same day. Alexander did not make an appearance at the convention, which caused speculation from the fans who attended the film's panel to question whether her name had been taken off the film. On August 15, website Latino Review reported that Lionsgate would be editing the film to receive a PG-13 rating. The director of photography, Steve Gainer, later claimed that the film will be "R" and that Alexander is still on board the project. On October 3, IGN confirmed that Alexander was not fired from the movie, based on an official statement they received from Lionsgate. In a December 2008 interview, Alexander confirmed that she had had serious battles with Lionsgate, but denied that she was ever officially off the film. "My name was never off, nor would I want it taken off, nor did I ever get a pink slip. The truth is that we had probably the same discussions that any other film has." Despite the much publicized discourse, Alexander says she is "extremely happy" with the final film:

In 2015, Alexander regretted that Lionsgate's control over the film resulted in the finished film's quality, stating,

Marvel was an equal partner, but unfortunately when there were creative decision conflicts, Marvel would let Lionsgate be the tie breaker. I always regretted that I made a Marvel movie this way, because 99% of their notes were much better than the studios and I was more in tune with them.

Alexander also noted that she did not have final cut of the film.

Reception

Box office
On its opening weekend, Punisher: War Zone grossed $4,271,451 in 2,508 theaters in the United States averaging $1,703 and ranking #8 at the box office. The film grossed $8,050,977 domestically, making Punisher: War Zone the lowest-grossing film based on a Marvel Comics property, below Elektra and Howard the Duck. It also grossed $2,049,059 internationally, bringing it to $10,100,036 worldwide, making it a box office bomb comparing to its $35 million budget.

Critical response
The consensus is: "War Zone recalls the excessively violent, dialogue-challenged actioners of the 1980s, and coincidentally feels two decades out of date." Roger Ebert of the Chicago Sun-Times awarded the film 2 out of 4 stars, writing, "You used to be able to depend on a terrible film being poorly made. No longer. The Punisher: War Zone is one of the best-made bad movies I've seen." He added that the film's only flaw is "that it's disgusting." Clark Collis writes that Ray Stevenson's "character could be called the Not-Much-of-a-Learning Curveinator." Frank Dasta of RobotBoombox.com gave the movie 0 out of 5 stars, stating, "May God have mercy on this film's soul. Punisher: War Zone is bland, uninspired, and it missed the point of the source material entirely. It's like these people have never even read a proper Punisher comic."

Edward Porter of the UK The Sunday Times gave the film 3 out of 5 stars, writing, "Earning an 18 certificate with its violence, the film is kids' stuff in all other respects: over-the-top shootouts, monstrous and barking-mad villains, a bumbling sidekick and so on. Highly enjoyable tosh." Movie reporter Peter Hartlaub of the San Francisco Chronicle wrote that it is the "best Punisher movie by far. The action is satisfying and the dark story is close to the tone of its Marvel Comics source material."

Comedian Patton Oswalt was a vocal supporter of the film since its release, calling it "THE BEST time I've had at the movies this year." In October 2011, Oswalt hosted a screening of the film in Los Angeles with director Lexi Alexander, and the two discussed the film with Paul Scheer in episode 20 of his podcast How Did This Get Made?

Home media

Punisher: War Zone was released on Region 1 DVD and Blu-ray on March 17, 2009. It was released on two different versions, a 2-disc special edition with a digital copy, and a standard version featuring both widescreen and fullscreen versions of the film. DVD sales for the film in North America (as of March 2010) was $14,001,953 in revenue from 576,151 units sold.

Video game

A tie-in PS3 video game, which shares fonts and models from the film, was released on July 2, 2009, via the PlayStation Network.

References

External links

Official site
 
 
 
 
 

2008 films
2008 action thriller films
Punisher films
German crime drama films
Columbia Pictures films
Lionsgate films
Films about orphans
Films set in psychiatric hospitals
Reboot films
American vigilante films
American action thriller films
American crime drama films
Films directed by Lexi Alexander
Films produced by Gale Anne Hurd
Films scored by Michael Wandmacher
Films set in 2008
Films set in New York City
Films shot in Montreal
Films shot in Vancouver
Films with screenplays by Art Marcum and Matt Holloway
2000s vigilante films
2000s English-language films
German action thriller films
2000s American films
2000s German films